Domeyko Glacier is a glacier flowing southeast into Mackellar Inlet, Admiralty Bay, King George Island, in the South Shetland Islands. It was named by the Polish Antarctic Expedition, 1980, after Ignacy Domeyko, a Polish born explorer of the Andes and sometime Professor of Chemistry and Mineralogy, and Rector, of the University of Chile, Santiago.

See also
 List of glaciers in the Antarctic
 Glaciology

References 

 

Glaciers of King George Island (South Shetland Islands)
Poland and the Antarctic